Phantogram may refer to:

Phantogram (band)
Phantogram (optical illusion)